Bernadette Farrell (born 26 March 1957) is a British hymnographer and composer of Catholic liturgical music. Among her compositions are "Christ, Be Our Light,” "Restless Is The Heart," "God, Beyond All Names" and "O God, You Search Me."

Biography 

Raised in West Yorkshire, Farrell studied at King's College London, and the Guildhall School of Music. Her first commission was from Liverpool Metropolitan Cathedral for the National Pastoral Congress of 1980.

She released five collaborative collections with the St Thomas More Group from 1985, and seven solo collections from 1990. Her work is published by Oregon Catholic Press.

A founding member of the St Thomas More Group, CHIME and the Music in Worship Foundation, she served on the Roman Catholic Bishops Liturgical Commission for many years. On the staff at Allen Hall Seminary from 1980-1986, her work in adult education encouraged the formation of lay liturgical ministries. She has been an adviser to two dioceses and a worship leader for organisations such as the Retreat Association and the Baptist Assembly. She is patron of the National Network of Pastoral Musicians (NNPM), and serves on the board of the Pratt Green Trust.

For three decades, Farrell worked in London’s East End, as an Advisor to Bishop Victor Guazzelli, a sponsor of The East London Communities Organisation (TELCO) and a community organiser. One of the founding organisers of London Citizens, she built the alliance across South London and authored a report on immigration (adopted by government), leading campaigns on safety, sanctuary, housing, wages and health. She was the first Deputy Director of Citizens UK.

Her music in contemporary Catholic culture 
Writing in a variety of styles, Farrell draws inspiration from the English choral tradition as well as the melodic roots of British folk song. Her texts are based on Scripture. She also sets to music the words of other authors, including those of her husband Owen Alstott, and New Zealand writer Shirley Murray.

Awards and accolades

Faculty Award for Theology, AKC, Kings College, London, 1977
ARSCM, 1999 
UCMVA Unity Award, Choral Collection of the Year, 2003
NPM, National Pastoral Musician of the Year Award, 2006 
London Citizens’ Founders Award for a Lifetime’s Service to Civil Society, 2013
Maybo Commendation for Outstanding Contribution to the Personal Safety of Young People, 2013 
Cranmer Award for Worship, Archbishop of Canterbury’s Lambeth Awards, 2018

Selected publications

Music collections and recordings

Sing Of The Lord’s Goodness (1986) St Thomas More Group
Come To Set Us Free (1987)  St Thomas More Group
We Are Your People (1987) St Thomas More Group
Holy Is God (1988) St Thomas More Group
Search For The Lord (1990) St Thomas More Group
God, Beyond All Names (1991)
Christ Be Our Light  (1994)
Restless Is The Heart  (2000)
Share The Light  (2000) 
Go Before Us  (2003)
A Bernadette Farrell Songbook  (2010)
Love Goes On  (2013)

Other

Celebrating One World: A Worship Resource Book on Social Justice, ed Linda Jones, Annabel Shilson-Thomas and Bernadette Farrell, Publ Harper Collins and CAFOD, 1989
A Humane Service for Global Citizens - South London Citizens Enquiry into Service Provision by the Immigration and Nationality Directorate at Lunar House. Report Publ. 2005
The People’s Champion, 1 March 2008, The Tablet
Housing our Future, Professor Peter Ambrose and Bernadette Farrell, December 2009, South London Citizens
A Guide for Safe Havens, 2009, London Citizens and Maybo
A Leaders Resource Guide for CitySafe, copyright 2011, CitizensUK
When in our Music God is Glorified, copyright 2016, The Pratt Green Trust

References

External links
Bernadette Farrell Biography – OCP.org
Canterbury Dictionary of Hymnology
Catholic Composer Works for Justice on the Streets of London - Catholic News

1957 births
Living people
Contemporary Catholic liturgical music
English hymnwriters
British women hymnwriters